Vaihinger is a surname. Notable people with the surname include:

Hans Vaihinger (1852–1933), German philosopher
Jörg Vaihinger (born 1962), German sprinter

See also
Vaihingen (disambiguation)